{
  "type": "FeatureCollection",
  "features": [
    {
      "type": "Feature",
      "properties": {},
      "geometry": {
        "type": "Point",
        "coordinates": [
          145.053638,
          -37.868735
        ]
      }
    }
  ]
}

Hedgeley Dene Gardens is a public open space in the suburb of Malvern East in Melbourne, Australia. It is one of the most popular parks in the Malvern East locality. It is also significant as an example of public open space design that recreates the qualities of an informal, picturesque English garden or northern European landscape in an Australian suburb. It forms part of a network of linear open spaces in Melbourne's eastern suburbs in the local government areas of the Stonnington and Boroondara, formed along drainage easements and watercourses such as Gardiners Creek. However, Hedgeley Dene Gardens is unique due to its particular landscape character.

Bibliography
 Cooper, JB (1935) The History of Malvern: From its First Settlement to a City, Melbourne: The Speciality Press
 Strahan, L (1989) Public and Private Memory: A History of the City of Malvern, North Melbourne: Hargreen

References

Parks in Melbourne
Gardens in Victoria (Australia)
City of Stonnington